The Darwin Channel forms a westward continuation of the Aisén Fjord and links it to the Pacific Ocean at Isquiliac Island. It is located in the coast of Chile at approximately 45.4° south latitude. This is one of the main channels situated between the islands of the Chonos Archipelago. Darwin Channel opens in the northern part of Darwin Bay and is considered the best of those which lead to Moraleda Channel, its navigation is free of dangers.

External links
 United States Hydrographic Office, South America Pilot (1916)
 https://web.archive.org/web/20070311034816/http://shoa.cl/cendhoc/cimar-4/Proyectos/fierro/Fierro-tabla4.htm

Straits of Chile
Landforms of Aysén Region